The following is a complete list of books published by Dame Jacqueline Wilson, an English novelist who writes for children's literature. Four of her books appear in the BBC's The Big Read poll of the 100 most popular books in the UK, and for her lifetime contribution as a children's writer, Wilson was a UK nominee for the international Hans Christian Andersen Award in 2014. Wilson is the author of many book series; her Tracy Beaker series, inaugurated in 1991 with The Story of Tracy Beaker, includes three sequels and has been adapted into five CBBC television series: [[The Story of Tracy Beaker (TV series)|The Story of Tracy Beaker]], Tracy Beaker Returns, The Dumping Ground, The Tracy Beaker Survival Files and My Mum Tracy Beaker''. As of 2021, Wilson has written over 100 novels.

Sequences

Tracy Beaker

The Werepuppy

Twin Tales

Adventure

Girls

Hetty Feather

World of Hetty Feather

Standalone novels

Non-fiction works

Notes

References

Wilson, Jacqueline
Wilson, Jacqueline